The flower hat jelly (Olindias formosus) is a species of hydromedusa in the hydrozoan family Olindiidae. Although they look like a jellyfish, they actually belong in the class Hydrozoa, while true jellyfish belong in class Scyphozoa. Flower hat jellies occur in the northwestern Pacific off central and southern Japan, and South Korea's Jeju Island. (close relatives live elsewhere, like O. sambaquiensis found off Argentina and Brazil). The adult form of the flower hat jelly only lives a few months and is typically seen from December to July, with peaks in April and May. During the day they rest on the bottom, often among rocks or algae, but at night they float up to hunt for their prey, typically small fish.

The sting of the flower hat jelly is generally mildly painful and leaves a rash. There is a single known human fatality from Japan.

Appearance and life cycle

This fluorescent jelly has lustrous tentacles that coil and adhere to its rim when not in use. Its bell is translucent and pinstriped with opaque bands. When first observed in the wild, typically around December, they only measure .

Little is known about the details of its life cycle and no Olindias hydroids have been reported from the wild. Flower hat jellies have bred in a display at the Monterey Bay Aquarium. The hydroids attached themselves to various surfaces and formed small clusters. In contrast, the two warmer temperatures appeared to produce more medusae. This matches the annual sea temperature variations observed in its native range.

References

Olindiidae
Animals described in 1903